United States extradition relations with Mexico have a history dating back to the 19th century, when Mexico became independent from Spain  . Mexico has long held a reputation for being a haven for criminals fleeing the United States, with the term "heading south of the border" often applied to those seeking to flee the United States legal system . Dog the Bounty Hunter once entered Mexico to bring back a U.S. fugitive.

See also

 Extradition law in the United States

References

Extradition case law
Mexico
Mexico–United States relations